List of national galleries is a list of national art galleries.

Africa
Iziko South African National Gallery, Cape Town, South Africa
National Art Gallery of Namibia, Windhoek, Namibia

The Americas
Galería Nacional, San Juan, Puerto Rico
Musée national des beaux-arts du Québec, Quebec City, Canada
National Art Gallery of The Bahamas, Nassau, Bahamas
National Gallery of Canada (Musée des beaux-arts du Canada), Ottawa, Canada
 National Gallery of Art, Washington, DC, U.S.
National Art Gallery (Caracas) Caracas, Venezuela
National Gallery of Jamaica Kingston, Jamaica

Asia
National Art Gallery (Bangladesh), Dhaka, Bangladesh
National Gallery of Modern Art, New Delhi, India
National Gallery of Indonesia, Jakarta, Indonesia
Jordan National Gallery of Fine Arts, Amman, Jordan
National Visual Arts Gallery (Malaysia), Kuala Lumpur, Malaysia
National Art Gallery, Pakistan, Islamabad, Pakistan
National Museum of Fine Arts (Manila), also known as National Art Gallery, Philippines
National Gallery Singapore, Singapore
National Gallery of Thailand, Bangkok, Thailand

Europe

Italy
Galleria Nazionale (Parma)
Galleria Nazionale d'Arte Antica, Rome
Galleria Nazionale d'Arte Moderna, Rome
Galleria Nazionale delle Marche, Urbino
Galleria Nazionale dell'Umbria, Perugia
Pinacoteca Nazionale di Bologna
Pinacoteca Nazionale in Ferrara
Pinacoteca Nazionale (Siena)

United Kingdom
National Gallery, London
Scottish National Gallery, Edinburgh
National Museum Cardiff (formerly the National Museum and Gallery of Wales), Cardiff
National Gallery, British Art (and other variants thereon), a former name of Tate Britain, London

Other European countries
National Art Gallery of Albania (Galeria Kombëtare e Arteve), Tirana, Albania
National Gallery of Armenia, Yerevan, Armenia
National Gallery of Bosnia and Herzegovina, Sarajevo, Bosnia and Herzegovina
National Art Gallery (Bulgaria) (Национална художествена галерия), Sofia, Bulgaria
Museu Nacional d'Art de Catalunya, Barcelona, Catalonia, Spain
National Gallery in Prague (Národní galerie v Praze), Czech Republic
Statens Museum for Kunst, Copenhagen, Denmark
Finnish National Gallery (Suomen Kansallisgalleria / Finlands Nationalgalleri), Helsinki, Finland
Ateneum art museum, and 
Kiasma, the museum of contemporary art
Sinebrychoff Art Museum
National Gallery (Berlin), Germany, two of whose components are:
Alte Nationalgalerie (Old National Gallery), Berlin
Neue Nationalgalerie (New National Gallery), Berlin
National Gallery (Athens), Greece (alternatively, the National Art Gallery and Alexandros Soutzos Museum)
National Museum of Contemporary Art, Athens, Greece
Hungarian National Gallery, Budapest, Hungary
National Gallery of Iceland (Listasafn Íslands), Reykjavik, Iceland
National Gallery of Ireland, Dublin, Ireland
Kunstmuseum Liechtenstein, Vaduz, Liechtenstein
National Gallery of Art (Vilnius), Lithuania
National Museum of Art, Architecture and Design (Nasjonalmuseet for kunst, arkitektur og design), Oslo, Norway
National Museum of Art of Romania, Bucharest, Romania
National Museum of Contemporary Art (Romania), Bucharest, Romania
Slovak National Gallery (Slovenská Národná Galéria), Bratislava, Slovakia
National Gallery of Slovenia (Narodna Galerija), Ljubljana, Slovenia
Nationalmuseum, Stockholm, Sweden
Zachęta National Gallery of Art, Warsaw, Poland

Oceania
National Gallery of Australia, Canberra, Australia
National Gallery of Victoria, Melbourne, Australia
National Art Gallery of New South Wales (now known as Art Gallery of New South Wales)
National Art Gallery of New Zealand, Wellington, New Zealand (now defunct)

See also
Museum of Fine Arts (disambiguation)
National archive
National library
National museum
National Portrait Gallery (disambiguation)

 
National galleries